The first of three 1951 Buenos Aires Grand Prix (official name: V Gran Premio del General Juan Perón y de la Ciudad de Buenos Aires) was a Formula Libre Grand Prix motor race that took place on February 18, 1951, at the Costanero Norte street circuit in Buenos Aires, Argentina.

Classification

References

Buenos Aires Grand Prix
Buenos Aires Grand Prix
Buenos Aires Grand Prix